The Westcoast Transmission Company Limited was a Canadian pipeline company founded in 1949 by entrepreneur Frank McMahon who saw an enormous opportunity to supply natural gas to the huge industrial and residential markets in the United States.

History 
In 1949, through a special Act of the Parliament of Canada, he incorporated Westcoast Transmission Co. Ltd. whose business plan included the construction of a 650-mile gas pipeline from Taylor in north-eastern British Columbia to the United States. McMahon personally began lobbying the Canadian and American governments to remove their restrictions on the export and import of natural gas. After exhaustive efforts he succeeded and in 1955 construction began on the Westcoast Pipeline, Canada's first "big-inch" pipeline. Along with its gathering system, processing plants and compressor stations were completed in the fall of 1957. In 1964, Westcoast Transmission built another processing plant at Fort Nelson, British Columbia in support of an additional 250-mile line to the company's new discoveries in the Canadian Northwest. In 1974, Westcoast Tramsmission created Foothills Pipeline Ltd., a subsidiary company established to build and operate the Canadian portions of the Alaska Natural Gas Transportation System.

Westcoast sold the company's natural gas distribution subsidiary, Centra Gas Manitoba, to Manitoba Hydro in 1999.

After McMahon's death in 1986, Westcoast Transmission Co. Ltd. was renamed Westcoast Energy Inc., and in 2002 Duke Energy of Charlotte, North Carolina, acquired the company in a deal worth US$3.5 billion. The natural gas pipeline business was later spun off as part of Spectra Energy, which merged with Enbridge in 2017.

References

 Gray, Earle. Wildcatters : The Story of Pacific Petroleums and Westcoast Transmission (1983) Cannon Book Distributors Ltd 
History of Westcoast Transmission at Heritage Community Foundation
 December 27, 1954 TIME magazine article titled The Big Poker Game on Frank McMahon’s plans for the Westcoast Transmission pipeline
 October 21, 1957 TIME magazine article titled Tycoon's Wing-Ding, a detailed account on Frank McMahon and the completion of the Westcoast Transmission pipeline
University of British Columbia Library record on Westcoast Energy Inc.

Natural gas companies of Canada
Natural gas pipelines in Canada
Duke Energy
Energy companies established in 1949
Non-renewable resource companies established in 1949